Yagi (written: 八木) is a Japanese surname. Notable people with the surname include:

, Japanese model and actress
, electrical engineer and professor; developer of the Yagi-Uda antenna
, Japanese ski jumper
, Japanese baseball player
, Japanese poet
, Japanese voice actor
, Japanese jazz musician
, Japanese comedian of the comedy duo Savanna
, Japanese karate master and teacher
, Japanese musician
, Japanese manga writer and artist
, Japanese baseball player
, Japanese professional baseball player
, Japanese TV director/producer
, Japanese professional baseball pitcher
, Japanese screenwriter

Fictional characters
, a character in the manga/anime series Fighting Spirit
, a character in the manga/anime series  My Hero Academia

See also 

 Yaghi (surname)

Japanese-language surnames